Naver TV (formerly Naver TV Cast) is a South Korean online video streaming and video sharing service developed and operated by Naver. The service primarily distributes web dramas and entertainment shows.

Their mobile app has rebranded as NOW with the addiction for promoting K-Culture. The website update are expected to be rolled out in the near future.

Original programming

Dramas

2013
 After School : Lucky Or Not
 Someday
 The Craving

2014

 Aftermath 
 Aftermath 2
 About Love
 Vampire Flower 
 Prominent Woman 
 Momo Salon
 A Better Tomorrow 
 Longing For Spring
 Dreaming CEO
 Missing Korea 
 Love Cells 
 Doll's House
 After School : Lucky Or Not 2
 One Sunny Day
 6 Person Of Room

2015

 Dream Knight 
 Dr. Ian 
 Exo Next Door
 Midnight's Girl 
 My Love Eun-Dong: The Beginning
 Prince of Prince 
 We Broke Up 
 Romance Blue 
 I Order You
 To Be Continued
 Noble, My Love 
 Drama Special - The Brothers' Summer 
 Love Cells 2 
 Immutable Law of First Love 
 Start Love
 9 Seconds - Eternal Time 
 Investigator Alice 
 Falling for Challenge
 Never Die 
 The Flatterer! 
 The Secret Message 
 Love Detective Sherlock K 
 Eating Existence 
 Delicious Love
 Sweet Temptation
 High-End Crush 
 Splash Splash Love

2016

 The Cravings 2 
 Ready for Start - Vol. 1 
 Choco Bank
 Devil's Diary 
 Rickety Rackety Family 
 Thumping Spike 
 Nightmare Teacher
 Click Your Heart 
 Tomorrow Boy 
 The Success Story of Novice Shaman Gong 
 Bong Soon, a Woman Who Dies When Loving 
 After the Show Ends 
 Touching You 
 Spark 
 Women at a Game Company
 Matching! Boys Archery
 Thumping Spike 2
 Be Positive 
 The Sound of Your Heart 
 My Romantic Some Recipe
 Clocking Out 
 What's Up With These Kids!?
 7 First Kisses 
 Love for a Thousand More 
 The Miracle 
 Justice Team 
 My Old Friend

2017

 Oppa Is Missing 
 Ruby Ruby Love 
 Three Color Fantasy - The Universe's Star 
 109 Strange Things 
 Three Color Fantasy - Romance Full of Life 
 Trace of the Hand
 Three Color Fantasy - Queen of the Ring 
 How Are U Bread
 Girl’s War  
 Mask
 The Boy Next Door
 Seventeen
 Idol Fever
 Moment
 I am... 
 Irish Uppercut
 Hip Hop Teacher
 Someone Noticeable
 Somehow 18
 Magic School
 Devil Inspector
 My Beautiful Laundrette
 Oh! Goddesses of Doll-like Beauty
 Last Minute Romance
 The Blue Sea
 We Are Peaceful Brothers
 29gram
 Romance Special Law
 Listen To Her Heart
 Unexpected Heroes
 The Best Time to Quit a Company
 All The Love In This World

2018
 A-Teen

2019
 A-Teen 2
 IN SEOUL
 The Guilty Secret
 Dear My Name
 4 Reasons Why I Hate Christmas

2020
 XX
 The Temperature of Language: Our Nineteen
 The World of My 17
 My Boss Is A Million YouTube
 Ga Doo Ri’s Sushi Restaurant
 IN SEOUL Season 2
 Another Peaceful Day of Second-Hand Items

2021
 Blue Birthday
 So I Married the Anti-fan

References

External links
  

Naver Corporation
Naver TV original programming
Internet television streaming services